Lunq'u (Quechua for fat, thick, plump / sphere, elliptical or round body / inhabitant of the coastal plains, Hispanicized spellings Lunco, erroneously also Limco) is a mountain in the Wansu mountain range in the Andes of Peru, about  high. It is situated in the Apurímac Region, Antabamba Province, Juan Espinoza Medrano District, in the Arequipa Region, La Unión Province, in the districts Huaynacotas and Pampamarca, and in the Ayacucho Region, Parinacochas Province, Coronel Castañeda District, where it is the easternmost point. The little river Lunq'u (Lunco) originates north of the mountain.

See also 
 Allqa Walusa
 Llamuqa

References 

Mountains of Peru
Mountains of Apurímac Region
Mountains of Arequipa Region
Mountains of Ayacucho Region